The 2018 FKF President's Cup, known as the 2018 FKF SportPesa Shield for sponsorship reasons, is the 2018 edition of the FKF President's Cup, the knockout football competition of Kenya.

Bracket
From round of 16:

Semi-finals
Sunday, September 23, 2018 
Kariobangi Sharks 4-1 Ulinzi Stars (MISC Kasarani, 2 pm)
Sofapaka 1-0 AFC Leopards (MISC Kasarani, 4.15 pm)

Third-Place Playoff
Saturday, October 20, 2018
Ulinzi Stars 1-1 (5-4 p) AFC Leopards (MISC Kasarani, 12 pm)

Final
Saturday, October 20, 2018
Kariobangi Sharks 3-2 Sofapaka (MISC Kasarani, 3.15 pm)

See also
2018 Kenyan Premier League

References

Kenya
Cup
Football competitions in Kenya
FKF President's Cup
FKF President's Cup seasons